Sheikh Junayd (died 1460) ( Shaikh Junaid) was the son of Shaykh Ibrahim, father of Shaykh Haydar and grandfather of the founder of Safavid dynasty, Shah Ismail I. After the death of his father, he assumed the leadership of the Safaviyya from 1447–1460.

History 
Under Junayd, the Safaviyya was transformed from a Sufi order organized around a saint-ascetic into an active military movement with a policy of conquest and domination. He was the first Safavi spiritual leader to espouse specifically Shia Islamic teachings, and in particular those of the Twelver ghulat. Junayd was viewed as a divine incarnation by his followers.

During his time in Ardabil, Junayd attracted so many disciples that in 1448, Jahan Shah (the Kara Koyunlu prince) drove him into exile to Anatolia and Syria. While there, he engaged in missionary activities and accumulated Turkmen followers. He then went to the court of Uzun Hassan at Diyarbakır, where he married Uzun Hassan's sister, Khadija Khatun, somewhere between 1456 and 1459.

Junayd was prevented from returning to Ardabil, so he lived at Shirvan where he died in a local skirmish near the Samur River in what is modern Azerbaijan, where he was buried. This led to the beginning of animosity between the mainly Sunni Shirvanshah and the increasingly heterodox Shi’i Safaviyya.

Mausoleum of Sheikh Juneyd is located in the village of Khazra in Azerbaijan. Junayd was succeeded by his son Shaykh Haydar, who married his cousin Halima Alamshah Khatun, daughter of Uzun Hassan and Theodora Despina Khatun. They had three sons and three daughters. One of them was Shah Ismail I, father of Shah Tahmasp I.

Succession

See also
Safavid dynasty
Safavid dynasty family tree

Notes

External links 

 JONAYD Encyclopædia Iranica

Safavid dynasty
Safaviyeh order
1460 deaths
Kurdish Sufis
Year of birth unknown
15th-century Kurdish people
Critics of Sunni Islam
Converts to Shia Islam from Sunni Islam